Stevens High School may refer to:

in the United States (by state)
 Stevens High School (New Hampshire), in Claremont, New Hampshire
 Stevens High School (Lancaster, Pennsylvania), listed on the National Register of Historic Places in Pennsylvania
 Stevens High School (South Dakota), in Rapid City, South Dakota
 John Paul Stevens High School, San Antonio, Texas

See also
Stevens School (disambiguation)